This is the complete list of Pan American Games medalists in weightlifting from 1951 to 2019. In the 1971 edition, four sets of medals were awarded for each weight.

Men's competition

Flyweight
–52 kg (1971–1991)
–54 kg (1995)

Bantamweight
–56 kg (1951–1967)
52–56 kg (1971–1991)
54–59 kg (1995)
–56 kg (1999–2015)
–61 kg (2019–)

Featherweight
56–60 kg (1951–1991)
59–64 kg (1995)
56–62 kg (1999–2015)
61–67 kg (2019–)

Lightweight
60–67.5 kg (1951–1991)
64–70 kg (1995)
62–69 kg (1999–2015)
67–73 kg (2019–)

Middleweight
67.5–75 kg (1951–1991)
70–76 kg (1995)
69–77 kg (1999–2015)
73–81 kg (2019–)

Light-heavyweight
75–82.5 kg (1951–1991)
76–83 kg (1995)
77–85 kg (1999–2015)

Middle-heavyweight
82.5 kg–90 kg (1955–1991)
83–91 kg (1995)
85–94 kg (1999–2015)
81–96 kg (2019–)

First-heavyweight
90–100 kg (1979–1991)
91–99 kg (1995)

Heavyweight
+90 kg (1951–1967)
90–110 kg (1971–1975)
100–110 kg (1979–1991)
99–108 kg (1995)
94–105 kg (1999–2015)
96–109 kg (2019–)

Super heavyweight
+110 kg (1971–1991)
+108 kg (1995)
+105 kg (1999–2015)
+109 kg (2019–)

Women's competition

Flyweight
48 kg (1999–2015)
49 kg (2019–)

Featherweight
53 kg (1999–2015)
55 kg (2019–)

Lightweight
58 kg (1999–2015)
59 kg (2019–)

Middleweight
63 kg (1999–2015)
64 kg (2019–)

Light-heavyweight
69 kg (1999–2015)
76 kg (2019–)

Heavyweight
75 kg (1999–2015)
87 kg (2019–)

Super-heavyweight
+75 kg (1999–2015)
+87 kg (2019–)

References

Weightlifting